Marthe Guillain (1890-1974) was a Belgian painter.

Biography 
Guillain was born in 1890 in Charleroi, Belgium. She was a student of Henry Leonardus van den Houten. She was married to the painter Médard Maertens. She traveled to Istanbul, Paris, and the Belgian Congo. She was a member of the Salon d'Automne.

Guillain died in 1974 in Watermael-Boitsfort, Belgium. Her work in the collection of the Royal Museums of Fine Arts of Belgium.

References

External links
 images of Guillain's work on ArtNet

1890 births
1974 deaths
People from Charleroi
19th-century Belgian women artists
20th-century Belgian women artists